Thames View Estate is a large housing estate in Barking and Dagenham in East London, England.

History
Constructed between 1954 and 1960 by Barking Borough Council, it features 2,000 homes rendering it the largest development constructed by the council. The site to the south of Barking was marshland and housing was constructed using piles and raft foundations. The name alludes to the proximity to the River Thames.

Environs
The built environment is made up of terraced housing, flats and maisonettes. Community facilities, churches (including the Anglican church of Christ Church) and schools are provided, and there is a small pedestrianised shopping precinct on Bastable Avenue, the main thoroughfare. The new development of Barking Riverside is being created adjacent to Thames View.

Transport

Public transport is provided by the East London Transit bus rapid transit service.

References

Areas of London
Housing estates in London
Districts of the London Borough of Barking and Dagenham